Greece was represented by (a record) of 51 athletes at the 2002 European Athletics Championships held in Munich, Germany.

Medals

Results

References

http://www.sansimera.gr/articles/804

2002 
Nations at the 2002 European Athletics Championships
2002 in Greek sport